Marie-Noëlle Gibelli (born 28 June 1957), is a Monegasque politician and midwife, member of the National Council since was elected in the 2018 general election.

She was born in Monaco on 28 June 1957 and is from Primo ! Priorité Monaco political party.

References

1957 births
Living people
Monegasque people
Midwives
Monegasque women in politics
21st-century women politicians
Members of the National Council (Monaco)
Priorité Monaco politicians